The Spanish Constitution of 1931 was approved by the Constituent Assembly on 9 December 1931. It was the constitution of the Second Spanish Republic (founded 14 April 1931) and was in force until 1 April 1939. This was the second period of Spanish history in which both head of state and head of government were democratically elected.

A constitutional draft prepared by a commission under a reformist Catholic lawyer Ángel Ossorio y Gallardo having been rejected, an amended draft was approved by the Constituent Assembly on 9 December 1931. It created a secular democratic system based on equal rights for all citizens, with provision for regional autonomy. It introduced female suffrage, civil marriage  and divorce. It permitted the state to expropriate private property, with compensation, for reasons of broader social utility. It also established free, obligatory, secular education for all and dissolved the Jesuits.

The Republic "was the culmination of a process of mass mobilisation and opposition to the old politics of notables." According to the historian Mary Vincent the Constitution envisaged "a reforming regime with an explicit and self-conscious view of what modernising Spain should entail. A secular state operating according to the rule of law with an admittedly ill-defined sense of social justice would open the way for an educated body of citizens to enjoy 'European' prosperity and freedom." According to Frances Lannon however, the articles on property and religion, with their exaltation of state power and disregard for civil rights, "virtually destroyed any prospect there had been for the development of a Catholic, conservative, Republicanism."

The new Constitution, among other laws, is described as having been anticlerical. While it afforded broad civil liberties and democratic representation, it abolished privileges associated with the Catholic Church, and did not explicitly protect Roman Catholic interests or rights. As anticlerical sentiment had been growing for decades, it culminated in escalating mob violence against the Church which the new government was unable to curb. This resulted in severely strained church-state relations, noted as a significant cause of the breakdown of the Republic and of the Spanish Civil War.

Background

The Second Republic began on 14 April 1931 after the departure from Spain of King Alfonso XIII, following local and municipal elections in which republican candidates won the majority of votes in urban areas. Though Alfonso did not formally abdicate, his departure from the country led to a provisional government under Niceto Alcalá Zamora, and a constituent Cortes drew up a new constitution.

The Second Republic in 1931 brought enormous hopes for Spanish workers and peasants, and in social terms some advances were made, especially for women. Prime Minister Manuel Azaña asserted that the Catholic Church was responsible in part for what many perceived as Spain's backwardness and advocated the elimination of special privileges for the Church. Azaña wanted the Second Spanish Republic to emulate the pre-1914 Third French Republic, make secular schooling free and compulsory, and construct a non-religious basis for national culture and citizenship.

Provisions
 
Following elections in June 1931 the new parliament approved an amended constitutional draft on 9 December 1931.

The constitution introduced female suffrage, civil marriage and divorce.  It also established free, obligatory, secular education for all.  However, some laws nationalized Roman Catholic Church properties and required the Roman Catholic Church to pay rent for the use of properties which it had previously owned.  In addition, the government forbade public manifestations of Catholicism such as processions on religious feast days, dissolved the Jesuits and banned Catholic education by prohibiting the religious communities of nuns, priests and brothers from teaching even in private schools.
The constitution also made the right to property subject to the public good, such that it could be nationalized as long as the owner was compensated.

The constitution granted freedom of religion to all, including non-Catholic worship in Spain.

Political aspects 

Head of State was the President of the Republic, who was elected by an Electoral College composed of members of legislative branch and elector citizens called compromisaries (compromisarios) elected by popular vote.

Legislature was in charge of a unicameral assembly, the General Courts (Cortes Generales), composed by members elected by popular vote for 4 years term. Popular initiative of law could be made at request of 15 percent of the country citizens, with restrictions on the subjects to be presented.

Executive branch was exercised by a Prime Minister (Presidente del Gobierno), appointed by the President of the Republic and General Courts, and a cabinet of ministers.

It was established a Court of Constitutional Guarantees (Tribunal de Garantías Constitucionales), whose work was guarding the constitutionality of laws and settling disputes between state powers.

It established the territorial division in provinces, and the possibility that those that had common cultural characteristics could be united to obtain the territorial autonomy as unified region through an Autonomy Statute (Estatuto de Autonomía).

Disestablishment of the privileges of the Roman Catholic Church

Although the constitution generally accorded thorough civil liberties and representation, there was a notable exclusion regarding the privileges of the Catholic Church, which some regarded as crucial to prevent the forming of an expansive democratic majority.

The controversial articles 26 and 27 of the constitution strictly controlled Church property and prohibited religious orders from engaging in education. This was seen as explicitly hostile to Roman Catholicism, both by supporters of the established Church, and by advocates of church-state separation. One such advocate of separation, José Ortega y Gasset, stated "the article in which the Constitution legislates the actions of the Church seems highly improper to me." Pope Pius XI condemned the Spanish Government's deprivation of the privileges of Catholics in the encyclical Dilectissima Nobis ("On Oppression Of The Church Of Spain").

In October 1931 José María Gil-Robles the leading spokesman of the parliamentary right declared that the constitution was 'stillborn' - a 'dictatorial Constitution in the name of democracy.' Robles  wanted to use mass meetings "to give supporters of the right a sense of their own strength and, ominously, to accustom them 'to fight, when necessary, for the possession of the street.'"

The conservative Catholic Republicans Alcalá-Zamora and Miguel Maura resigned from the government when the controversial articles 26 and 27 of the constitution, which strictly controlled Church property and prohibited religious orders from engaging in education were passed.

Frances Lannon calls the constitution "divisive" in that the articles on property and religion,  prioritizing state power, had a "disregard for civil rights" and ruined the prospect of the development of a Catholic, conservative, Republicanism. Likewise, Stanley Payne agrees that the constitution generally accorded a wide range of civil liberties and representation with the notable exception of the rights of Catholics, a circumstance which prevented the formation of an expansive democratic majority.

Since the far left considered reform of these aspects of the constitution as totally unacceptable, commentators have opined that "the Republic as a democratic constitutional regime was doomed from the outset".  Commentators have posited that such a "hostile" approach to the issues of church and state were a substantial cause of the breakdown of democracy and the onset of civil war. One legal commentator emphasized that "the gravest mistake of the Constitution of 1931-Spain's last democratic Constitution prior to 1978-was its hostile attitude towards the Catholic Church."

Liberties for religious minorities
The Spanish Constitution of 1931 attempted to secure religious liberty for religious organizations other than Roman Catholics, halting discrimination and persecution of Jews and Protestants. However, this freedom would be curbed by the Franco's dictatorial regime that granted the Roman Catholic Church the status of official religion of Spain and prohibited other public religious manifestations.

See also
Spanish First Republic
Pact of San Sebastián

References

External links
 Constitución de la República Española de 1931 (Spanish)
 English Translation of the Constitution of the Spanish Republic (1931)

Constitutions of Spain
1931 in law
Constitution
Spain 1931
Second Spanish Republic
Constitution of 1931
Republicanism in Spain
Secularism in Spain
1931 documents